The 1991–92 Roller Hockey Champions Cup was the 28th edition of the Roller Hockey Champions Cup organized by CERH.

Liceo achieved their third title.

Teams
The champions of the main European leagues and Barcelos, as title holder, played this competition, consisting in a double-legged knockout tournament.

Bracket

Source:

References

External links
 CERH website

1991 in roller hockey
1992 in roller hockey
Rink Hockey Euroleague